David Warrilow (28 December 1934 – 17 August 1995) was an English actor best known as one of the "finest interpreters of Samuel Beckett’s work".

Life and career
A shoemaker's son born in Stone, Staffordshire, Warrilow studied at the University of Reading under James Knowlson, Beckett’s biographer. In 1967 in Paris, he joined Réalités, editing the magazine for eleven years. He co-founded the Mabou Mines theater group in 1970. Three years later, he starred in a theatrical adaptation of Beckett’s The Lost Ones, directed by Lee Breuer and Thom Cathcart. In 1984, he directed a cinematic adaptation of the novella.

At Warrilow's request, Beckett wrote A Piece of Monologue for him in 1979, impressed by the actor’s bilingualism. "In August 1977", writes James Knowlson, "the actor, David Warrilow, who had had such a resounding success with the adaptation of The Lost Ones, wrote to Beckett asking him if he would write a solo piece for him to perform. Questioned as to what he had in mind, Warrilow wrote back saying that he 'had an image of a man standing on stage lit from above. He’s standing there in a sort of cone of light. You couldn't see his face and he’s talking about death.' Beckett's reply began: 'My birth was my death.'" The play, directed by the actor, premiered in New York in December 1979.

In 1981 Warrilow played the "Reader" in Beckett's Ohio Impromptu under Alan Schneider’s direction. First performed in Columbus, Ohio, the play toured New York City, Paris, London and Edinburgh. In 1983 in Paris, he starred in Beckett’s That Time and Catastrophe, both plays directed by Alan Schneider. In 1989 in London, Warrilow was Krapp in Beckett’s Krapp's Last Tape, directed by Antoni Libera.

Between 1986 and 1995, the actor worked with Paris-based theater director Joël Jouanneau, interpreting the texts of Samuel Beckett, Thomas Bernhard, Joseph Conrad, Robert Pinget, and Robert Walser. In 1991 Warrilow played the role of Stanford Garland in the film Barton Fink, directed by Joel Cohen. A year after his performance in Beckett’s Company, a theatrical reading directed by Jouanneau at the Petit Odéon in Paris, Warrilow died of complications of AIDS in 1995, aged 60.

Filmography
1975: The Lost Ones (directed by Lee Breuer)
1980: Simon (directed by Marshall Brickman) - Blades
1981: Strong Medicine (directed by Richard Foreman) - Doctor
1984: Le Dépeupleur (directed by David Warrilow) (adaptation of novella by Samuel Beckett)
1987: Radio Days (directed by Woody Allen) - Roger
1988: Bright Lights, Big City (directed by James Bridges) - Rittenhouse
1988: Milan noir (directed by Ronald Chammah) - Moran
1989:  (directed by Jacques Rouffio) - Piepe
1991: Buster's Bedroom (directed by Rebecca Horn) - Mr. Warlock
1991: Barton Fink (directed by Joel Coen) - Garland Stanford
1992: Mirror On The Moon (directed by Leandro Katz) - Douglas Stonea
1994: Les Derniers Jours d'Emmanuel Kant (directed by Philippe Collin) - Immanuel Kant (final film role)

Theatre 
1978: The Lost Ones by Samuel Beckett, directed by Lee Breuer and Thom Cathcart, Théâtre Gérard Philipe (Saint Denis)
1983: Solo, cette fois by Samuel Beckett, directed by K. D. Codish, Théâtre National de Strasbourg, Théâtre Gérard Philipe (Saint-Denis)
1984: Akhnaten by Philip Glass, directed by Achim Freyer, Stuttgart State Theatre
1985: Marat/Sade by Peter Weiss, directed by Walter Le Moli, MC93, Bobigny
1986: Catastrophe and Impromptu d'Ohio by Samuel Beckett, directed by Pierre Chabert, Théâtre Renaud-Barrault
1987: L'Hypothèse by Robert Pinget, directed by Joël Jouanneau, Festival d'Avignon
1988: Minetti by Thomas Bernhard, directed by Joël Jouanneau, Théâtre des Treize Vents
1990: Les Enfants Tanner by Robert Walser, directed by Joël Jouanneau, Théâtre de la Bastille
1990: En attendant Godot by Samuel Beckett, directed by Joël Jouanneau, Théâtre Nanterre-Amandiers
1992: Le Marin perdu en mer by Joël Jouanneau, Théâtre de l'Athénée-Louis-Jouvet
1992: Au cœur des ténèbres by Joël Jouanneau, adaptation of Heart of Darkness by Joseph Conrad, Théâtre de l'Athénée-Louis-Jouvet 
1993: L'Inquisitoire by Robert Pinget
1994: La Dernière Bande by Samuel Beckett, directed by Joël Jouanneau, Théâtre de l'Athénée-Louis-Jouvet
1994: Compagnie by Samuel Beckett, directed by Joël Jouanneau, Petit Odéon

Distinctions 
1975: Obie Award for "The Lost Ones"
1990: Chevalier de l'Ordre des Arts et Lettres
1994: Prix du Syndicat de la critique : Prix du meilleur comédien du Syndicat de la critique for Compagnie by Samuel Beckett

Notes and references

External links 

English expatriates in France
1934 births
1995 deaths
People from Stone, Staffordshire
English male stage actors
English male film actors
20th-century English male actors
AIDS-related deaths in France